Khuashak Tsokali was a Georgian politician, wife of an aristocrat of the blood and high official Bega Surameli and mother of Ratithe Eristavt-Eristavi (Grand-duke) of Kartli. Khuashak Tsokali was one of the two female dignitaries who negotiated on behalf of George III's successor, Tamar, a peace deal with the rebellious political faction led by Qutlu Arslan c. 1184.

References 

12th-century people from Georgia (country)
13th-century people from Georgia (country)